Chris Waddell (born 1968) is an American Paralympic sit-skier and wheelchair track athlete. He was a promising non-disabled skier while attending Middlebury College in Vermont, before a skiing accident left him paralysed from the waist down.

As a sit-skier, Waddell won medals in the 1992, 1994, 1998 and 2002 Winter Paralympics. As a wheelchair track racer, he represented the US at the 1996, 2000 and 2004 Summer Paralympics. He won a silver medal in the 200m T53 event at the Sydney Paralympic Games. In 2004, he set a T53 world record time for this distance which still stands.

In 2006, Waddell was inducted into the National Disabled Ski Hall of Fame by Disabled Sports USA. In 2010, he was inducted into the Paralympic Hall of Fame.

On 30 September 2009, Waddell became the first paraplegic to climb Mount Kilimanjaro. On 5 May 2010 he was named the 2010 Shining Star of Perseverance Honoree by the WillReturn Council of Assurant Employee Benefits to honor and recognize individuals and groups who overcome disabilities to succeed in the workplace and society.

Currently, Wadell has a foundation called "One Revolution" that is dedicated to seeing the world positively, by the use of "Nametags" that define oneself.

References

External links
 Chris Waddell's Athlete's for Hope profile
 
 Chris Waddell at the U.S. Olympic & Paralympic Hall of Fame

Alpine skiers at the 1992 Winter Paralympics
Alpine skiers at the 1994 Winter Paralympics
Alpine skiers at the 1998 Winter Paralympics
Alpine skiers at the 2002 Winter Paralympics
American male wheelchair racers
Paralympic gold medalists for the United States
Paralympic silver medalists for the United States
Paralympic bronze medalists for the United States
World record holders in Paralympic athletics
Athletes (track and field) at the 1996 Summer Paralympics
Athletes (track and field) at the 2000 Summer Paralympics
Athletes (track and field) at the 2004 Summer Paralympics
Place of birth missing (living people)
1968 births
Living people
Medalists at the 1992 Winter Paralympics
Medalists at the 1994 Winter Paralympics
Medalists at the 1998 Winter Paralympics
Medalists at the 2002 Winter Paralympics
American male alpine skiers
Middlebury College alumni
People with paraplegia
Medalists at the 2000 Summer Paralympics
Paralympic medalists in alpine skiing
Paralympic alpine skiers of the United States
Paralympic medalists in athletics (track and field)
Paralympic track and field athletes of the United States